Pacino di Buonaguida (active circa 1303 – about 1347) was an Italian painter active in Florence in the Gothic.

Little is known of his biography, and only one work is signed, an altarpiece at the Accademia di Belle Arti in Florence. Scholars now attribute over 50 works to the painter. The Chiarito tabernacle at the Getty Museum in California is attributed to Pacino, and he contributed to an important illuminated manuscript, the Laudario di Sant'Agnese. A complex Tree of Life attributed to Pacino is at the Accademia.

References

Year of birth unknown
Year of death unknown
14th-century Italian painters
Italian male painters
Painters from Florence
Gothic painters
Year of birth uncertain